Koudum is a village in the northern Netherlands. It is located in Súdwest-Fryslân, Friesland. Nearby villages include Molkwerum to the west, Workum to the north and Hemelum to the south. The population of Koudum was 2,700 in 2019. The nearest train station is the Koudum-Molkwerum railway station.

There is a restored windmill in the village, De Vlijt.

History 
The village was first mentioned in 855 as Coluuidum, and means "charcoal woods". Koudum developed on the higher clay ground in the Gaasterland region. It used to be a linear settlement with a little centre around the church. Koudum was the capital of the former municipality of  until 1984.

Koudum was home to 925 people in 1840. Before 2011, Koudum was the seat of the former municipality of Nijefurd. Before 1984, it was part of Hemelumer Oldeferd municipality.

Population 

 1954 - 1,966
 1959 - 1,861
 1964 - 1,915
 1969 - 2,213
 1973 - 2,268
 2004 - 2,600
 2017 - 2,695
 2019 - 2,700

De Vlijt 
De Vlijt is a restored windmill in the village. The mill was originally built in the 18th century as a polder mill in Oppenhuizen or Sneek. In 1986, the mill was moved to its current location and rebuilt into a corn rack mill.

Gallery

References

External links

Súdwest-Fryslân
Populated places in Friesland